"Martin's Close" is a ghost story by British writer M. R. James, included in his 1911 collection More Ghost Stories of an Antiquary.

Plot summary 
The story is presented as a report of a trial in the year 1684, before Judge Jeffreys. Squire George Martin has been accused of murdering a young girl named Ann Clark, with whom he had a one-sided romance. The prosecution presents the case that Martin murdered Ann Clark, because she ruined a good marriage proposal for him. During the trial, an event is described in which Martin acted in a guilty manner when confronted with a possible apparition of the girl. In the end, Martin is found guilty of the crime, despite his attempt to have the case dismissed on a legal technicality, and is sentenced to death.

Adaptations
A version of the story, Martin's Close, adapted by Mark Gatiss, was broadcast on 24 December 2019 on BBC Four as part of the long-running A Ghost Story for Christmas series and again 24 December 2020. It stars Peter Capaldi, Elliot Levey, Wilf Scolding, Sara Crowe, James Holmes, Jessica Temple,  Simon Williams, Fisayo Akinade, and Ian Hallard.

References

External links

 
Full text of "Martin's Close"

A Podcast to the Curious: Episode 14 - Martin's Close

Short stories by M. R. James
1911 short stories
Ghosts in written fiction
Short stories adapted into films
Horror short stories